HMS Iron Duke was the last of four  central battery ironclads built for the Royal Navy in the late 1860s. Completed in 1871, the ship was briefly assigned to the Reserve Fleet as a guardship in Ireland, before she was sent out to the China Station as its flagship. Iron Duke returned four years later and resumed her duties as a guardship. She accidentally rammed and sank her sister ship, in a heavy fog in mid-1875 and returned to the Far East in 1878. The ship ran aground twice during this deployment and returned home in 1883. After a lengthy refit, Iron Duke was assigned to the Channel Fleet in 1885 and remained there until she again became a guardship in 1890. The ship was converted into a coal hulk a decade later and continued in that role until 1906 when she was sold for scrap and broken up.

Design and description
The Audacious class was designed as a second-class ironclad intended for overseas service. Iron Duke had a draught of  forward and  aft. The Audacious-class ships displaced  and had a tonnage of 3,774 tons burthen. They had a complement of 450 officers and ratings.

Iron Duke had a pair of two-cylinder, horizontal-return, connecting-rod steam engines, each driving a single  propeller using steam provided by six rectangular boilers.

Around 1871 they were re-rigged as barques with their sail area reduced to  To reduce drag, the funnel was telescopic and could be lowered. Under sail alone, they could reach .

The main armament of the Audacious-class ships consisted of 10 RML  rifled muzzle-loading guns. Six of these were positioned on the main deck, three on each broadside, and the other four guns were mounted on the corners of the upper deck battery. The battery protruded over the sides of the ships to give the guns a certain amount of end-on fire.

The ships were equipped with four RML 6 in (152 mm) 71 cwt guns as chase guns, two in the bow and another pair in the stern. They also had six RBL 20 pdr  rifled breech-loading guns that were used as saluting guns. In 1878, the ships received four  torpedo launchers on the main deck and the 6-inch guns were replaced by four breech-loading BL 5-inch guns during the mid-1880s.

The wrought iron waterline armour belt of the Audacious class covered the entire length of the ships. The main deck citadel's ends were protected by a  forward bulkhead and a  one aft. The sides and embrasures of the upper battery were six inches thick, but its ends were unprotected.

Construction and career
Iron Duke, named after the nickname for Arthur Wellesley, 1st Duke of Wellington, was the first ship of her name to serve in the Royal Navy. The ship was laid down at Pembroke Dockyard on 23 August 1868, launched on 1 March 1870 and was completed on 1 January 1871, at a cost of £208,763. She was initially assigned as a First Reserve Guardship at Plymouth, but was assigned as the flagship of the China Station in September. En route to the Far East, she became the first ironclad to use the Suez canal; virtually all of her coal had to be unloaded to reduce her draught and she was towed by three tugboats through the canal in three days. Relieved by her sister ship, Iron Duke returned to the UK in 1875. To save money on the return ship, no tugboats were hired and the ship ran aground four times and frequently scraped the sides of the canal during her four-day transit. Upon her arrival, she was paid off in May.

Iron Duke recommissioned two months later and was assigned as the guardship at Hull. During the First Reserve Squadron's summer cruise on 1 September, she was en route with three other ironclads between Dublin and Queenstown (now Cobh). In a thick fog, the ship accidentally rammed her sister, Vanguard, off Kish Bank, in Dublin Bay. Iron Duke had her bowsprit wrecked, but was otherwise little damaged. Her ram, however, had torn a  hole in Vanguards side. The ram also damaged the watertight bulkhead between Vanguards engine and boiler rooms which flooded both compartments and prevented her crew from using her steam-powered pumps. The ship sunk in a little over an hour after all of the crew abandoned ship. Following the collision, Iron Duke was overhauled at Plymouth Dockyard, with attention being given to the watertight doors on board. At 10:00 on 20 November 1877, Iron Duke departed from Plymouth for sea trials. She was  out when it was found that the main sluice valve had been left open and she was sinking. Her crew closed the watertight doors and manned the pumps. An order was given to fire the distress signal, but it was found that there was no powder on board. Black Prince repeated the signal to Mount Wise, which repeated the signal to Plymouth. In the meantime, a crewman had managed to close the valve. He was waist deep in water and had he been a few minutes later a diver would have been required. With the valve closed, the pumps were able to clear the water, and the ship was dry at 15:00. She put back to Plymouth, the trial being cancelled. It was subsequently revealed that four condenser valves, each  diameter were involved. Difficulty in closing them was caused by excessive stiffness in the springs. This was alleviated by the fact that the valve handles had been lengthened during the refit, giving greater leverage. It was reported that efforts were made by those responsible for the refit to obstruct the Admiralty enquiry into the event.

Following the loss, Iron Duke replaced Vanguard as the guardship at Kingstown, County Dublin, where she received the latter's crew and remained until July 1877 when the ship began a lengthy refit that lasted until August 1878. She 
was inspected by Admiral Thomas Symonds, Commander-in-Chief, Plymouth, on 22 July. Vice-Admiral Robert Coote hoisted his flag aboard Iron Duke on 9 November. on 9 May 1879, she ran aground at the mouth of the Yangtze. She was refloated with assistance 36 hours later. Minor damage was sustained, and she sailed to Hiogo, Japan to be [dry]docked. Iron Duke ran aground on a sandbar entering the Huangpu River in May 1880, after five days, she was pulled free by the American paddlewheel river gunboat  with little damage. Princes Arisugawa Taruhito and Arisugawa Takehito visited Iron Duke on 22 July while she was visiting Yokohama, Japan. Several weeks later, Arisugawa Takehito came aboard to serve as a midshipman. The ship struck a rock off the coast of Hokkaido en route to Aniva Bay, Sakhalin Island, on 30 July 1880. She floated off on 1 August after another ship had also grounded while trying to assist; her repairs required a month in drydock in Hong Kong. On 28 January 1881, Coote hauled down his flag and was relieved by Vice-Admiral George Willes, the new Commander-in-chief, of the China Station. On 10 October, the ship was drydocked in Nagasaki, Japan, and then sailed to Woosung, on 26 October. Iron Duke returned home in January 1883 and began a lengthy refit that included the replacement of her boilers.

On 16 April 1885, the ship became a member of Admiral Geoffrey Hornby's Particular Service Squadron until August, when she joined the Channel Squadron. After the ironclad  broke loose from her anchors in Lisbon on 24 December 1886 during a gale and accidentally rammed and sank the French steamship , Iron Dukes crew manned one boat in search for survivors, although it is uncertain how many they saved. The following year, Iron Duke participated in Queen Victoria's Golden Jubilee Fleet review on 1 July 1887 at Spithead. She was reduced to reserve in 1890 and was converted to a coal hulk in 1900, serving at Kyles of Bute. The ship was transferred from Fleet Reserve to Dockyard Reserve at Portsmouth in April 1902, and eventually sold for scrap on 15 May 1906 to Galbraith of Glasgow.

Notes

Citations

Bibliography

External links

 

Audacious-class ironclads
Victorian-era battleships of the United Kingdom
Ships built in Pembroke Dock
Coal hulks
1870 ships
Maritime incidents in September 1875
Maritime incidents in November 1875
Maritime incidents in May 1879
Maritime incidents in May 1880
Maritime incidents in July 1880